The 2007 Vuelta a Asturias was the 51st edition of the Vuelta a Asturias road cycling stage race, which was held from 3 May to 7 May 2007. The race started and finished in Oviedo. The race was won by Koldo Gil of the  team.

General classification

References

Vuelta Asturias
2007 in road cycling
2007 in Spanish sport